Tuajuanda C. Jordan has served as the seventh president of St. Mary’s College of Maryland since July 1, 2014. From 2006 to 2011, Jordan served as director of the Howard Hughes Medical Institute’s Science Education Alliance program, where she launched the SEA-PHAGES program.  This program has been implemented at more than 100 institutions and resulted in numerous scientific and pedagogical publications.  Prior to joining St. Mary’s College, Jordan also held a number of leadership positions in higher education, including dean of the College of Arts and Sciences and professor of chemistry at Lewis & Clark College in Oregon,  and associate dean in the College of Arts and Sciences at Xavier University of Louisiana.

Awards and honors 
Jordan’s recent honors include being named as one of Fisk University’s Talented Tenth (2016), Purdue University Distinguished Women Scholar (2015-15), and Influential Marylander by the Daily Record (2015).  She received the Torchbearer Award (2014) from the National Coalition of Black Women, Baltimore Metropolitan Chapter, and was inducted (2015) into the Zeta Chapter of Phi Beta Kappa.

References

External links
 Biography & CV

Heads of universities and colleges in the United States
Living people
Year of birth missing (living people)
Women heads of universities and colleges
St. Mary's College of Maryland faculty
Xavier University of Louisiana faculty
Lewis & Clark College faculty